Dario Romero (born April 13, 1978) is a former Canadian football defensive tackle. He was signed by the Edmonton Eskimos of the Canadian Football League as a free agent in 2001. He played college football at Eastern Washington.

College career
Romero was a two-time All-Big Sky Conference player at Eastern Washington. Romero finished his college career with 22 quarterback sacks, ranking him fifth in school history.

Professional career
Romero signed with the Edmonton Eskimos of the Canadian Football League as a free agent in 2001. After a year in Edmonton, Romero was signed by the Miami Dolphins of the National Football League in 2002. Romero spent three seasons with the Dolphins, appearing in 22 games with two starts and recording 3.5 sacks.

Romero did not play football in 2005, but signed as a free agent in 2006 with the Montreal Alouettes. He played in 31 regular season games for Montreal over two seasons while also playing in the 2006 Grey Cup. Romero signed with the Eskimos again in 2008 and played three more seasons in Edmonton while being named a CFL West All-Star in both 2008 and 2009.

In April, 2011, Romero signed a free agent contract with the Saskatchewan Roughriders. On April 19, 2012, he was released by the Riders. He has a son named Dario Romero (DJ) who currently lives in Spokane Washington.

External links
 Saskatchewan Roughriders bio

1978 births
Living people
Players of American football from Spokane, Washington
American football defensive tackles
Canadian football defensive linemen
American players of Canadian football
Eastern Washington Eagles football players
Edmonton Elks players
Miami Dolphins players
Montreal Alouettes players
Saskatchewan Roughriders players